Chromosome 3 open reading frame 38 (C3orf38) is a protein which in humans is encoded by the C3orf38 gene.

Gene 
The C3orf38 gene is located on chromosome 3 (3p11.1) on the forward strand. It spans 18,771 bases from chr3:88,149,959-88,168,729. It contains 3 exons. Common aliases for this gene are MGC26717, LOC285237, and FLJ54270. Some of the genes neighboring C3orf38 include ZNF654, CGGBP1, and LOC105377202.

Transcripts

Protein 

The C3orf38 protein is 329 amino acids in length. A large domain of unknown function, DUF4518, encompasses majority of the C3orf38 protein. This domain is a part of the protein family pfam15008, which is thought to be involved in apoptosis regulation. This pfam15008 is the only member of the cl20886 superfamily. While the C3orf38 protein does not have any abnormal amino acid abundance as a whole, the DUF4518 has a high abundance of histidines and a low abundance of serines, according to compositional analysis. The predicted molecular weight of the entire C3orf38 protein is 37.0 kD and the isoelectric point is 6.01. The DUF4518 contained inside the C3orf38 protein has a predicted molecular weight of 31 kD and an isoelectric point of 6.49.

Regulation

Gene Level Regulation 
There have been a number of potential promoters identified for the C3orf38 gene, which are described in the table below.

The C3orf38 gene exhibits ubiquitous expression in human tissues.

Protein Level Regulation 
The C3orf38 protein is expected to be found with the highest confidence in the cytoplasm. This finding is supported by examination of an array of C3orf38 orthologs.

There are several well conserved post translation modification sites found amongst the human C3orf38 protein and its orthologs, which are depicted in the table below. Majority of these PTMs are PKC phosphorylation sites. Additionally, two confirmed active sites are located in the C3orf38 protein. The first is an aldehyde dehydrogenases glutamic acid active site located from amino acids 1-8. The second site is a eukaryotic thiol (cysteine) proteases histidine active site located from amino acids 227-237.

Homology/evolution 
Orthologs for the C3orf38 protein can be found in mammals, reptiles, birds, amphibians, fish, and invertebrates using BLAST searches. A selection of these orthologs can be found in the ortholog table below. There are no paralogs. Additionally, by comparing sequences of C3orf38 protein with cytochrome C and fibrinogen alpha proteins, a moderate rate of evolution was determined for the C3orf38 protein.

Function 
Although investigation into the function of the C3orf38 gene is ongoing, a couple studies have granted valuable insights into its role. One study has identified C3orf38 as a candidate proapoptotic gene. Another study identified C3orf38 as a top candidate tumor suppressor gene (TSG).

Interacting proteins 
Of the various proteins C3orf38 protein interacts with, two are particularly interesting seeing as C3orf38 is a candidate proapoptotic and tumor suppressor gene. First, BAG family molecular chaperone regulator 4 (BAG4) is an anti-apoptotic protein that is known to interact with a number of apoptosis and growth-related proteins. Second, DnaJ Heat Shock Protein Family Member B4 (DNAJB4) is a member of the heat shock protein-40 family (Hsp40), a molecular chaperone, and a tumor suppressor (specifically for colorectal carcinoma).

References